The 2014 Kangaroo Cup was a professional tennis tournament played on outdoor hard courts. It was the eighteenth edition of the tournament and part of the 2014 ITF Women's Circuit, offering a total of $75,000 in prize money. It took place in Gifu, Japan, on 28 April–4 May 2014.

Singles main draw entrants

Seeds 

 1 Rankings as of 21 April 2014

Other entrants 
The following players received wildcards into the singles main draw:
  Yurika Aoki
  Shuko Aoyama
  Naomi Osaka
  Miki Ukai

The following players received entry from the qualifying draw:
  Liu Fangzhou
  Yumi Miyazaki
  Junri Namigata
  Ana Veselinović

The following player received entry by a lucky loser spot:
  Tammi Patterson

The following player received entry with a protected ranking:
  Jarmila Gajdošová

Champions

Singles 

  Tímea Babos def.  Ekaterina Bychkova 6–1, 6–2

Doubles 

  Jarmila Gajdošová /  Arina Rodionova def.  Misaki Doi /  Hsieh Shu-ying 6–3, 6–3

External links 
 2014 Kangaroo Cup at ITFtennis.com
 Official website 

2014 ITF Women's Circuit
2014
2014 in Japanese tennis
April 2014 sports events in Japan
May 2014 sports events in Japan